George Roth (April 25, 1911 – October 31, 1997) was an American gymnast and Olympic champion. He competed at the 1932 Summer Olympics in Los Angeles where he received a gold medal in  club swinging. 

Roth was unemployed when the games commenced, and would take food from the Olympic Village back to his wife and baby daughter in East Hollywood. After receiving his gold medal in front of 60,000 spectators, Roth walked out of the stadium and hitchhiked back to his home.

Roth died on October 31, 1997, at the age of 86.

References

1911 births
1997 deaths
Gymnasts at the 1932 Summer Olympics
Olympic gold medalists for the United States in gymnastics
American male artistic gymnasts
Medalists at the 1932 Summer Olympics